Krasnogorsk (Красногорск) is a series of spring-wound 16mm mirror-reflex movie camera designed and manufactured in the USSR by Krasnogorsky Zavod (KMZ), produced between 1966 and 1993. 

There were four models of this series released by KMZ:

 Krasnogorsk-1 (1966)
 Krasnogorsk-2 (1966)
 Krasnogorsk-3 (1971)
 Krasnogorsk-4 (1974)

A total of 105,435 Krasnogorsk-3 cameras were produced between 1971 and 1993. 

This series was one of the most popular 16mm movie cameras in Eastern Europe, where it made a prominent appearance in Krzysztof Kieślowski's 1979 film Camera Buff. The Krasnogorsk cameras are still popular among independent filmmakers today.

Models

References

External links
 List of Zenit cameras
 Zenit camera models and number of products per year

Movie cameras
Soviet cameras